Nicholas Mickoski (December 7, 1927 – March 13, 2002) was a  Canadian ice hockey forward. He played in the National Hockey League with four teams between 1948 and 1960. The rest of his career, which lasted from 1945 to 1965, was spent in various minor leagues. He was born in Winnipeg, Manitoba.

Playing career
Mickoski started his National Hockey League career with the New York Rangers in 1947. He would also play for the Chicago Black Hawks, Detroit Red Wings, and Boston Bruins. He retired after the 1960 season. After retiring in 1960, Nick went on to play in the WHL and coached the Grand Falls Cataracts in the NAHA senior hockey league in the Canadian province of Newfoundland and Labrador beginning in 1967.

Career statistics

Regular season and playoffs

Awards and achievements
Played in NHL All-Star Game (1956)
WHL First All-Star Team (1963)
WHL Championship (1963)
Inducted into the Manitoba Sports Hall of Fame and Museum in 2004
Honoured Member of the Manitoba Hockey Hall of Fame
 In the 2009 book 100 Ranger Greats, was ranked No. 77 all-time of the 901 New York Rangers who had played during the team's first 82 seasons

References

External links

1927 births
2002 deaths
Boston Bruins players
Canadian expatriate ice hockey players in the United States
Canadian ice hockey coaches
Canadian ice hockey forwards
Canadian people of Ukrainian descent
Chicago Blackhawks players
Detroit Red Wings players
New York Rangers players
New York Rovers players
Providence Reds players
St. James Canadians players
San Francisco Seals (ice hockey) players
Ice hockey people from Winnipeg
Toronto Maple Leafs players
Winnipeg Jets (1972–1996) coaches
Winnipeg Jets (WHL) coaches
Winnipeg Warriors (minor pro) players